Michael Barry Owens (born 11 November 1969) is a former New Zealand international cricketer. He played eight Test matches and one One Day International for New Zealand from 1992 to 1994.

He was born in Christchurch.

1969 births
Living people
New Zealand cricketers
New Zealand Test cricketers
New Zealand One Day International cricketers
Canterbury cricketers